The pharyngobasilar fascia is a fascia of the pharynx. It is situated between the mucous and muscular layers of the pharynx. It forms as a thickening of the pharyngeal mucosa above the superior pharyngeal constrictor muscle. It attaches to the basilar part of occipital bone, the petrous part of the temporal bone (medial to the pharyngotympanic tube), the (posterior border of the) medial pterygoid plate, and the pterygomandibular raphe. It diminishes in thickness inferiorly. Posteriorly, it is reinforced by the pharyngeal raphe. It reinforces the pharyngeal wall where muscle is deficient.

Additional images

See also 

 Buccopharyngeal fascia

References

External links
 
 http://ect.downstate.edu/courseware/haonline/labs/l31/100101.htm
 http://www.instantanatomy.net/headneck/areas/phpharyngobasilarfascia.html

Fascial spaces of the head and neck